The Black Midi Anthology Vol. 1: Tales of Suspense and Revenge is an anthology album by English rock band Black Midi, self-released on 5 June 2020. The album was released as a download only, exclusively to Bandcamp, as part of the website's monthly revenue waiver to support artists during the COVID-19 pandemic.

Composition
The first four tracks on the album consist of short stories (written by prominent literary figures including Ernest Hemingway and Edgar Allan Poe) read by the members of the band over instrumental jams. Three instrumental tracks, taken from much of the same recordings as the backing jams for the spoken word tracks, are also included. The band refers to the release as an audiobook on its website.

Release
Due to the financial impact of the COVID-19 pandemic on musicians in 2020 from not being able to tour, Bandcamp announced it would be waiving its share of revenue and donating all sales to artists for 24 hours on March 20. Bandcamp repeated the initiative in the following months, including on June 5. Black Midi contributed The Black Midi Anthology Vol. 1: Tales of Suspense and Revenge specifically for the initiative on this day. The album remained available on the band's Bandcamp page afterwards.

Track listing

Personnel
Black Midi
Geordie Greep – voice on "Hop-Frog" and "A Woman's Confession", baritone guitar
Matt Kwasniewski-Kelvin – electric guitar
Cameron Picton – bass guitar, voice on "Who Is to Pay?"
Morgan Simpson – drums, voice on "Out of Season"
Additional
Dan Carey – live FX, producer
Alexis Smith – engineer and tape operator
Stories produced, engineered and edited by Black Midi.

References

Spoken word albums by English artists
Experimental music albums by English artists
2020 albums